Ballard School, also known as Ballard Elementary School, is a historic school building in Brunswick, Georgia. It was added to the National Register of Historic Places on October 27, 2004. It is located at 325 Old Jesup Highway. The Ballard Elementary School was built in ca. 1910s and was known as the County Community School. In the 1920s an annex was connected to the original building by a breezeway. The school was renovated in 2009 and is rented out for conferences and meetings.

See also
National Register of Historic Places listings in Glynn County, Georgia

References

External links
 

School buildings on the National Register of Historic Places in Georgia (U.S. state)
Buildings and structures in Glynn County, Georgia
Brunswick, Georgia
National Register of Historic Places in Glynn County, Georgia